Dharan Kumar (born 8 October 1983) is an Indian music composer, who mainly produces film scores and soundtracks in the Tamil film industry. He made his film debut Parijatham, featuring the hit single "Unnai Kandene". He credits director and actor K. Bhagyaraj as his guru.

Early life
Dharan was born on 8 October 1983 in Chennai, Tamil Nadu. He did his schooling at St. Johns, Don Bosco Matriculation Higher Secondary School and Anna Gem schools in Chennai. He started working as an assistant to composer Harris Jayaraj in the films Kaakha Kaakha, Chellame and Anniyan.

Career

Film scores
Dharan used to participate in music programs in the college, director K. Bhagyaraj's daughter Saranya studied in. Dharan entered the film industry as a composer in 2005. For Saranya Bhagyaraj's debut venture, Parijatham, directed by her father, Saranya recommended Dharan as the film composer. The album became a chartbuster, with the song "Unnai Kandaene" being listed among the top ten songs of the year. Sify in its review described Dharan's songs and background score as "a major highlight" of the film, which became a commercial successful as well.

His next release was the soundtrack album to the low-budget horror thriller Sivi that starred newcomers. The album received very positive reviews and response as well, while Dharan's background score was highly appreciated by critics and described as "haunting", and "top-class" that gives the film "its true color". Behindwoods, in particular, praised his work, citing that Dharan had "enjoyed his work and threatened [the audience] continuously with his music", further adding that he had understood his role "perfectly well" and "delivered the goods with a sharp flourish". The film, despite garnering favourable reviews, performed poorly at the box office. Only 2009, his next album, the soundtrack to the gangster film Laadam, released, which was based on Hip-hop music, featuring Malaysian rappers Dr. Burn and Emcee Jezz. The film, directed by Prabu Solomon, also bombed at the box office, failing to propel his career.

In 2010, Dharan first release was Bharath's Thambikku Indha Ooru, which, too was highly unsuccessful at the box office, while his next release would be Siddu, collaborating again with K. Bhagyaraj. The soundtrack to the film was released in 2009, for which he made composer Yuvan Shankar Raja and director Venkat Prabhu to sing each a song, with the former's song "Poove Poove" emerging a chartbuster. He made his Malayalam debut with The Thriller, starring Prithviraj Sukumaran and worked on the Salsa-based romantic-musical Podaa Podi which also features a Bhangra number. Upon the release on 10 October 2012, the album became a big chartbuster.

Non-film ventures
Dharan has worked on non-film projects as well. In 2009, he produced a single "Sing One More Time" as a tribute to Michael Jackson, who Dharan describes as his "biggest inspiration in his childhood". The single, which also partly features lyrics by him, was rendered by ten singers and released as a video album. He had also composed the theme song for the 2010 Challenger Beach Volleyball Championship, held in Chennai, apart from composing jingles for television advertisements. Dharan composed team anthems for the cricket team Ruby Trichy Warriors in the 2016 and 2017 editions of Tamil Nadu Premier League. The multi-talented T. Rajendar gave voice for team anthem of 2016 edition and the lyrics were written by RJ Vijay, while for 2017 edition anthem, both voice and lyrics were given by RJ Vijay. In January 2018, RJ Vijay and Dharan associated again to produce a single "Yaaru Kitta"- a Jallikattu anthem as a tribute to 2017 pro-jallikattu protests. In March 2021, Dharan collaborated with Sivaangi Krishnakumar and released an album song "Asku Maaro" featuring Kavin and Teju Ashwini with lyrics penned down by Ku. Karthik and was directed by Dongli Jumbo.Personal life
In September 2017, Dharan married film actress Deekshitha Manikkam.

 Filmography 

Released projects

Notes:
 The films are listed in order that the music released, regardless of the dates the film released.
 The year next to the title of the affected films indicates the release year of the either dubbed or remade version in the named language later than the original version.
 # indicates that Dharan has only the background score, while the songs are by another composer.
 • indicates original language release. Indicates simultaneous makes, if featuring in more languages.
 ♦ indicates a remade version, the remaining ones being dubbed versions.

Independent songs

Singer

Upcoming projects

 ThollaikatchiTakku Mukku Tikku ThalamKoduvaaTelevision
 2008 Maanada Mayilada 2014 Uyirmei 2021 Thalattu''

Webseries

References

External links
 

Living people
Tamil musicians
Tamil film score composers
Tamil playback singers
1983 births
Don Bosco schools alumni
Indian male playback singers
Indian male composers
Musicians from Chennai
Male film score composers